James Whitcomb Riley High School is a high school in South Bend, Indiana; serving most of the city's south side. The school is named in honor of the "Hoosier Poet", James Whitcomb Riley. The school is operated by South Bend Community School Corporation and governed by the SBSC's Board of School Trustees.

Boys Swimming

The Men's swim team at Riley, is the most successful athletic program in the South Bend Community School Corporation. Founded in 1952 it has had dozens of swimmers win individual state titles and be named All-Americans.
.

State Titles
The Men's swim team at Riley, is the most successful athletic program in the South Bend Community School Corporation, with 7 State Titles ( 1955–56, 1956–57, 1957–58,1961–62,1977–78,1985–86,1994–95), and 7 State-Runner Titles ( 1960–61, 1975–76, 1978–79, 1979–80, 1982–83, 2001–02,2002–03). 
.

Sectional Titles
Along with their state titles the team has won 29 Sectional titles (1975–76, 1977–78, 1980–81, 1981–82, 1982–83, 1983–84, 1985–86, 1986–87, 1987–88, 1988–89, 1989–90, 1990–91, 1991–92, 1992–93, 1993–94, 1994–95, 1995–96, 1996–97, 1997–98, 1998–99, 1999-00, 2000–01, 2001–02, 2002–03, 2005–06, 2006–07, 2008–09, 2016–17, 2017–18)
.

Conference Titles
They Riley High School Boys Swim team has also won an additional 31 Northern Indiana Conference Titles ( 1955–56, 1256–57, 1957–58, 1960–61, 1961-1962, 1975–76, 1976–77, 1977–78, 1981–82, 1982–83, 1983–84, 1984–85, 1985–86, 1986–87, 1987–88, 1988–89, 1989–90, 1990–91, 1991–92, 1992–93, 1993–94, 1994–95, 1995–96, 1996–97, 1999-00, 2001–02, 2002–03, 2003–04, 2005–06,2006–07, 2016,17).
.

City Titles
Since the start of the S.B.C.S.C City Championship Riley has accumulated 32 City Tiles ( 1955–56, 1961–62, 1975–76, 1976–77, 1977–78, 1989–90, 1990–91, 1991–92, 1992–93, 1993–94, 1994–95, 1995–96, 1996–97, 1997–98, 1998–99, 1999-00, 2000–01, 2001–02, 2002–03, 2003–04, 2004–05, 2005–06, 2006–07, 2007–08, 2008–09, 2009–10, 2014–15, 2015–16, 2016–17, 2017–18, 2018–19, 2019-20).

Win–loss record
Since the start of the 2001–02 and to the end of the 2019-2020 season the team has accumulated a win–loss record of 222-42-1.

.

Girls Basketball
In the early 2000s, Riley experienced some success in girls basketball being the 4-A state runner-up in 2002 and semi state runner-up in 2003.  Since then, they have accumulated a win loss record of 30-143 from the 2006-2014 seasons..

Good Morning America
On September 30, 2020, the national morning news show Good Morning America came to Riley to bring awareness to schools and learning during the COVID-19 pandemic. ABC News Correspondent Will Reeve along with GMA donated a $20,000 grant in partnership with Donor's Choose, and 1200 WiFi-Hotspots for five years in partnership with AT&T.
.

Notable alumni

Joe Domnanovich - American football center
Ron Dunlap - politician
Fred Evans - American football running back
Larry Karaszewski - Screenwriter
Steve Nemeth - American football quarterback
Bob Rush - professional baseball pitcher
Jackie Walorski - politician, former U.S. Representative in Indiana's 2nd congressional district
Daniel Waters - Screenwriter
Mark Waters - Screenwriter
Doug Wead - political commentator and writer
Blake Wesley - professional basketball player
Marcus Wilson - professional basketball player 
Tom Wukovits - professional basketball player

See also
 List of high schools in Indiana

References

External links
 

Public high schools in Indiana
James Whitcomb Riley
Education in South Bend, Indiana
Educational institutions established in 1924
Schools in St. Joseph County, Indiana
Magnet schools in Indiana
1924 establishments in Indiana